The 2008–09 season (started 19 June 2008) is Anorthosis' 60th consecutive season in the Cypriot First Division. The team finished 1st in the league in the previous season so it will represent Cyprus in the Champions League. The first training session for the season took take place at the training ground at Antonis Papadopoulos Stadium on June 18, 2008.
On August 27, 2008, they became the first Cypriot football club to reach the group stages of the Champions League, defeating Olympiacos of Greece in the third qualifying round.

In December 2008, Andreas Panteli, the chairman of the company since 2004, resigned and he was replaced by Chris Georgiades. Manager Temuri Ketsbaia left the club by mutual consent in April 2009 and was replaced by Michalis Pamboris as caretaker.

Current squad 
Last Update: 14 February 2009

Transfers

Summer
In

 

Out

Winter
In:

Out:

Foreign players
Teams in the Cypriot First Division can register up to eighteen non-EU nationals and players with European ancestry.

International players

Club

Management

Kit

|
|
|

Other information

Competitions

Marfin Laiki League

Classification

Results by round

Playoffs table
The first 12 teams are divided into three groups. Points are carried over from the first round.

Matches

Pre-season and friendlies 
Anorthosis left on 25 June for Amsterdam, Netherlands, and Golden Tulip Victoria athletic centre to perform most of their pre-season training. The team returned on
9 July. While in Netherlands Anorthosis played four friendly matches.

LTV Super Cup
Time at EET

Regular season
Time at EET

Playoffs

Cypriot Cup
All times at EET

Second round

2008–09 UEFA Champions LeagueTime at CET''

First Qualifying Round

Second Qualifying Round

Third Qualifying Round

Group Stage: Group B

References

Anorthosis Famagusta F.C. seasons
Anorthosis Famagusta